Protactinium(V) iodide is an inorganic compound, with the chemical formula of PaI5.

It can be prepared by the reaction of metals protactinium and iodine, or by reacting protactinium(V) chloride, protactinium(V) bromide or protactinium(V) oxide with silicon tetraiodide.

It reacts with antimony trioxide in a vacuum at 150 °C to give the iodide oxides PaOI3 and PaO2I; it reacts with protactinium(V) bromide at 350 °C to obtain mixed halides PaBr3I2. It reacts with the monocarbide at 600 °C to give tetraiodide.

Aristid von Grosse was able to produce pure metallic protactinium with the decomposition of protactinium(V) iodide.

When heated at 300 °C for a long time, it decomposes and iodine is released:
 PaI5 → PaI3 + I2

References

Protactinium compounds
Iodides